The term sextuple is mainly used in the sports press for winning six important national and international titles in sport, especially in football, within one sporting year or season.

During a football season, clubs typically take part in a number of national competitions, such as in a league and one or more cup competitions, and sometimes in continental competitions. Winning multiple competitions is considered a particularly significant achievement. Doubles and triples tend to be long-remembered achievements, but they occur with a certain frequency, while winning four or more trophies in a season is much less common. In the 2010s, the terms quadruple, quintuple, and sextuple were sometimes used to refer to four, five, and six trophies in a single season.

This list is limited to clubs that play in the top division of their league system.

FC Barcelona and FC Bayern Munich are the only two teams to have achieved the sextuple, having achieved that in 2009 and 2020 respectively.

Sextuple in European football 
In terms of football, the sextuple means that a club has to win six official competitions in a row. The performance can be achieved through victories in the same season.

The three national titles 

 winning the national championship
 winning the national cup
 winning the national supercup or winning the national league cup

The two international titles in Continent 

 winning the UEFA Champions League
 winning the UEFA Super Cup

The international title worldwide 

 winning the FIFA Club World Cup

Sextuple winners

2009:  Barcelona

2020:  Bayern Munich

Trophies

Missed sextuples 
The following teams could not win the sixth official competition after the quintuple and thus missed the sextuple:

 1995:  Ajax – won the Eredivisie, the Johan Cruyff Shield, the UEFA Champions League, the UEFA Super Cup and the Intercontinental Cup, but lost the quarter-finals of the 1994–95 KNVB Cup against Feyenoord.
 2006:  Al Ahly – won the Egyptian Premier League, the Egypt Cup, the Egyptian Super Cup, the CAF Champions League, the CAF Super Cup, but lost the semi-finals of the FIFA Club World Cup aganist Internacional.
2010:  Inter Milan – won the Serie A, the Coppa Italia, the Supercoppa Italiana, the UEFA Champions League and the FIFA Club World Cup, but lost the UEFA Super Cup against Atlético Madrid.
 2011:  Barcelona – won La Liga, the Supercopa de España, the UEFA Champions League, the UEFA Super Cup and the FIFA Club World Cup, but lost the final of the Copa del Rey against Real Madrid.
 2013:  Bayern Munich – won the Bundesliga, the DFB-Pokal, the UEFA Champions League, the UEFA Super Cup and the FIFA Club World Cup, but lost the DFL-Supercup against Borussia Dortmund.
 2015:  Barcelona – won La Liga, the Copa del Rey, the UEFA Champions League, the UEFA Super Cup and the FIFA Club World Cup, but lost the Supercopa de España against Athletic Bilbao.
 2017:  Real Madrid – won La Liga, the Supercopa de España, the UEFA Champions League, the UEFA Super Cup and the FIFA Club World Cup, but lost the quarter-finals of the 2016–17 Copa del Rey against Celta Vigo.

The seventh title 
On 11 February 2021, just minutes after the 2020 FIFA Club World Cup Final had ended, Pep Guardiola jokingly challenged Bayern Munich to a match with previous sextuple winner Barcelona. As these two teams were the only ones to achieve a sextuple in football history, he suggested that they could play for a seventh title.

Technically it is possible to win seven trophies; for example, a top-flight English club can win the Premier League, the FA Cup, the EFL Cup, the FA Community Shield, the UEFA Champions League, the UEFA Super Cup and the FIFA Club World Cup in a calendar year. 

Celtic were close to achieving this when they won the Scottish First Division, Scottish Cup, Scottish League Cup, and the European Cup in 1967. However, there was an absence of a Scottish or European Super Cup, and their loss against Argentine side Racing Club in the 1967 Intercontinental Cup prevented them from achieving seven major honors.

See also 

 Treble
 Double
List of association football teams to have won four or more trophies in one season

Notes

External links 

 Alle Titel des FC Bayern der Saison 2019/20 rp-online.de
 Der FC Bayern krönt sich mit dem historischen „Sextuple“ rp-online.de
 Remembering FC Barcelona's Unprecedented Sextuple Forbes
 Ten years since historic sextuple FC Barcelona

References 

Association football terminology